Adverse effects by frequency for use of valproate semisodium.

Very common (>10% frequency)

 Nausea
 Tremor

Common (1-10% frequency)

 Liver injury
 Gastralgia
 Diarrhoea
 Extrapyramidal (movement) disorder
 Stupor
 Somnolence
 Convulsion 
 Memory impairment
 Headache
 Nystagmus
 Confusional state
 Aggression
 Agitation
 Impaired attention
 Hyponatraemia
 Anaemia
 Thrombocytopaenia
 Hypersensitivity
 Transient and/or dose-related hair loss
 Dysmenorrhea
 Haemorrhage (bleeding)
 Weight gain

Uncommon (0.01-0.1% frequency)

 Pancreatitis (sometimes lethal)
 Coma
 Lethargy
 SIADH
 Pancytopenia
 Leucopenia
 Rash
 Angioedema
 Amenorrhoea (absence of menstrual cycle)
 Vasculitis
 Peripheral oedema
 Reduced bone mineral density
 Osteopaenia
 Osteoporosis
 Pleural effusions
 Gingival enlargement

Phasmophobia

Rare (<0.01% frequency)

 Reversible dementia
 Reversible cerebral atrophy
 Abnormal behaviour
 Psychomotor hyperactivity
 Learning disorder
 Hyperammonaemia
 Hypothyroidism
 Bone marrow failure
 Toxic epidermal necrolysis
 Stevens–Johnson syndrome
 Erythema multiforme
 DRESS syndrome
 Male infertility
 Polycystic ovaries
 Enuresis
 Reversible Fanconi syndrome
 Coagulation abnormalities
 Systemic lupus erythematosus
 Gynaecomastia

Notes

References

Anticonvulsants
GABA transaminase inhibitors
Organic sodium salts
Teratogens
Mood stabilizers